Sharabian (also Romanized as Sharabīān, Sharabeyān, and Sharabīyān) is a city in Mehraban District of Sarab County, East Azerbaijan province, Iran. At the 2006 census, its population was 4,374 in 1,038 households. The following census in 2011 counted 4,737 people in 1,322 households. The latest census in 2016 showed a population of 4,877 people in 1,520 households.

References 

Sarab County

Cities in East Azerbaijan Province

Populated places in East Azerbaijan Province

Populated places in Sarab County